Döpfner is a surname. Notable people with the surname include:

 Julius Döpfner (1913–1976), German cardinal of Roman Catholic Church
 Mathias Döpfner (born 1963), German business executive and journalist

German-language surnames